Hugh Smyth (born 1941) is a Northern Irish politician.

Hugh Smyth may also refer to:

Hugh Lyle Smyth (1833–1911), merchant, JP and High Sheriff of Cheshire
Hugh Smyth, local historian on the TV series On the Street Where You Live

See also
Hugh Smith (disambiguation)
Hugh H. Smythe, American author, sociologist, diplomat and professor